The Pengtoushan culture was a Neolithic culture located around the central Yangtze River region in northwestern Hunan province, China. It dates to around 7500–6100 BC, and was roughly contemporaneous with the Peiligang culture to the north. It is named after the type site at Pengtoushan.

Sites 
Pengtoushan, located in Li County, Hunan, is the type site for the Pengtoushan culture. Excavated in 1988, Pengtoushan has been difficult to date accurately, with a large variability in dates ranging from 9000 BC to 5500 BC. Cord-marked pottery was discovered among the burial goods. 

Another important site is Bashidang, also in Li County, belonging to the late stage of the Pengtoushan culture. It features a wall and a ditch, as well as a star-shaped platform.

Rice cultivation 
Rice residues at Pengtoushan have been carbon dated to 8200–7800 BC, showing that rice had been domesticated by this time. At later stages, pots containing grains of rice were also dated to approximately 5800 BC. By 4000 BC, evidence of rice domestication in the region is abundant in the form of bone and wooden spades, as well as pottery. The rice grains at Pengtoushan are larger than naturally occurring wild rice. Large amounts of rice grains have also been found at Bashidang.

Gallery

See also
List of Neolithic cultures of China
Daxi culture
Qujialing culture
Nanzhuangtou

Footnotes

References
 
 
 
 

History of Hunan
Neolithic cultures of China
Major National Historical and Cultural Sites in Hunan
8th-millennium BC establishments